Bushy's Brewery is a local brewery in Braddan in the Isle of Man, which was founded by brother and sister Martin and Nicky Brunnschwieler in 1986.

In October 1984, they took over Zhivago's Bar in Victoria St, Douglas and, two years later, started a microbrewery in the cellar and made their own brand Old Bushy Tail, a red-brown beer with a strong malt flavour with an after-taste of hops and caramel. The location was named Bushy's Brewpub. A professional brewer, Davey Jones from London, was placed in charge of quality, and in 1990 a new brewery opened, with famous British writer Michael Jackson, known for the book The World Guide To Beer (1977) and as a "beer guru", attending the official opening. Currently, the head brewer is Neil "Curly" Convery. The brewery is connected to the annual motorcycle race on Man, TT Races, with the "Ale of Man" and the Bushy's beer tent on Douglas promenade.

In 2000 Bushys Brewpub on Douglas Promenade closed, and the building is now used as a corporate office. The brewery moved to new premises at Santon, and each TT the pub operates a Beer tent on Douglas Promenade. The breweries other assets include The Bay Hotel in Port Erin and The Rovers Return in Douglas.

In 2014 Bushys Brewery introduced their first lager, Norseman Craft Lager.

Beers 
 Manx Bitter (3.8%)
 Ruby (1874) Mild (3.4%)
 Castletown Bitter (3.5%)
 Old Bushy Tail (4.5%)
 Piston Brew (4.5%)
 Weiss Bier (4.5%)

Seasonal/occasional beers include:
 Oyster Stout (4.2%)
 Lovely Jubbly Winter Ale (5.2%)
 Manannan's Cloak (4.0%)
 Buggane
 Fairy Bridge
 Manx Pride
 Silverd Ale (4.0%) made with Manx grown barley.
 Jo3ys (a tribute to Joey Dunlop)
 Shuttleworth Snap (a tribute to the film No Limit)
 Golden Oldie (a tribute to Radio Caroline)
 Old Seadog (for the 2015 Peel Traditional Boat Weekend)

A special beer, 'Golden Ale' was brewed in 2012 to celebrate 50 years since the foundation of the Isle of Man TT Marshall's Association. The beer was launched at the 1st Isle of Man CAMRA beer festival on 12 April 2012.

References

External links 
 Company's official website, which covers events connected to the company, but less about the brewery itself.
 independent beer website
 from Visit Isle of Man, Isle of Man Government tourism website.

Beer in the Isle of Man